The marching ants effect is an animation technique often found in selection tools of computer graphics programs. It helps the user to distinguish the selection border from the image background by animating the border. The border is a dotted or dashed line where the dashes seem to move slowly sideways and up and down. This creates an illusion of ants marching in line as the black and white parts of the line start to move. Some prefer the term marquee selection, as the effect resembles the chaser lights of a marquee, and this term can be considered a synonym. Popular graphics programs, such as the GIMP and Adobe Photoshop, implement their selection tools using the marching ants effect. The technique was first widely used by the MacPaint program developed by Bill Atkinson.

The easiest way to achieve this animation is by drawing the selection using a pen pattern that contains diagonal lines. If the selection outline is only one pixel thick, the slices out of the pattern will then look like a dashed line, and the animation can easily be achieved by simply shifting the pattern one pixel sideways and redrawing the outline. The method has the disadvantage of not looking like marching ants with selection borders that are not parallel to the coordinate axes.

Origin 

With the selection problem in mind, Bill Atkinson went to his favorite pub in Los Gatos. Something on the wall caught his attention. It was an electric Hamm's Beer sign. The beer sign consisted of an illuminated scene of a kind of animated waterfall. Water seemed to flow down the waterfall into the lake. Bill figured that this effect could solve his problem because it is easily recognizable.

He implemented the idea and showed it to Rod Perkins from the Lisa team, who told Bill the effect reminded him of "marching ants".

References

External links 
 Fun with marching ants describes another scheme for generating the marching ants pattern

Graphical user interface elements
History of computing